Lee Seong-gye King Taejo is 1965 South Korean film directed by Choe In-hyeon and starring Shin Young-kyun and Kim Ji-mee. It is based on King Taejo.

Plot
Lee Seong-gye is an ordinary man, the second son of Lee Ja-chun, who passes a state military examination in his early age and becomes a general who defeats his enemies and become Chief. Seong-rye takes power against King Gongyang who is responsible for the death of his father and older brother. He leads his army and defeats Gongyang's soldiers. Seong-gye becomes King and is renamed as Taejo of Joseon.

Cast
Shin Young-kyun
Kim Ji-mee
Park Nou-sik 
Lee Kyoung-hee 
Kim Wun-Ha 
Yang Hun 
Do Kum-bong
Park Am
Kim Dong-won 
Heo Jang-kang

External links
 
 

South Korean war drama films
1965 films
South Korean biographical films